The S10 is a railway service of the St. Gallen S-Bahn that provides half-hourly service between  and  over the Wil–Kreuzlingen and Winterthur–Romanshorn lines. THURBO, a joint venture of Swiss Federal Railways and the canton of Thurgau, operates the service.

Operation 
It is the only service between Wil and Weinfelden. Between Weinfelden and Romanshorn it is supplemented by long-distance services and the S7. On weekends, service is reduced to hourly.

Route 

  –  – 

 Wil SG
  (stops only on request)
  (stops only on request)
  (stops only on request)
  (stops only on request)
  (stops only on request)
  (stops only on request)
  (stops only on request)
  (stops only on request)
 Weinfelden
 
 
 
 
 
 Romanshorn

History 
The December 2013 timetable change applied the S10 designation to an existing service between Wil and Weinfelden. It ran half-hourly on weekdays and hourly on weekends, and did not continue to Romanshorn.

References

External links 

 Fahrplan Ost

St. Gallen S-Bahn lines
Transport in the canton of St. Gallen
Transport in Thurgau